Spoltore (locally Spuldórë) is a comune and town in the province of Pescara in the Abruzzo region of Italy, with a population of c. 17,000.

Personality
 Giuseppangelo Fonzi (1768-1840), dental surgeon and dental technician known for having improved the dental prostheses.

References